The Army Black Knights women's lacrosse team is an NCAA Division I college lacrosse team representing the United States Military Academy as part of the Patriot League. They play their home games at Michie Stadium in West Point.

Head coach
The Black Knights were led by coach Kristen Skiera, who was named the team's inaugural head coach prior to the 2016 season. Prior to assuming the duties of Army's NCAA Division I program, Skiera was the coach of Army's club team for its final year.

Michelle Tumolo was named head coach in June 2021. Prior to becoming the head coach at Army, Tumolo spent three seasons as the head coach at Wagner Seahawks.

Individual career records

Reference:

*Minimum 20 saves
**Minimum 500 minutes

Individual single-season records

*Minimum 20 saves
**Minimum 250 minutes

Individual game records

*Minimum 30 minutes played & 10 shots faced

Seasons

References

Army Black Knights women's lacrosse
Lacrosse clubs established in 2016